Ján Lepka (born 3 January 1977) is a Slovak cyclist. He competed at the 2000 Summer Olympics and the 2004 Summer Olympics.

References

1977 births
Living people
Slovak male cyclists
Olympic cyclists of Slovakia
Cyclists at the 2000 Summer Olympics
Cyclists at the 2004 Summer Olympics
Sportspeople from Plzeň